ClickBank is a global e-commerce platform and affiliate marketplace, founded in 1998. The company has more than six million clients worldwide which secured it in becoming the 87th largest Internet retailer in North America. 

In 2011, the site had attracted over 1,500,000 affiliate marketers. Approximately 100,000 of whom were designated as 'active' at any given time.

ClickBank is an e-commerce platform for physical and digital products, digital content creators (also known as sellers) and affiliate marketers, who then promote them to consumers. ClickBank has an affiliate marketplace that assists vendors in building visibility and revenue-generating opportunities.

In 2011, it offered over 46,000 individual products to its affiliate marketers. It has annual turn over $1 Billion USD.

References

External links 
 Official Website

Companies based in Boise, Idaho
American companies established in 1998
Retail companies established in 1998
Online retailers of the United States
1998 establishments in Idaho